The 2011–12 Danish Superliga season was the 22nd season of the Danish Superliga, which decided the Danish football championship. F.C. Copenhagen were the defending champions, having won their ninth league championship and third consecutively last season.

Since Denmark climbed from fifteenth to twelfth place in the UEFA association coefficient rankings at the end of the 2010–11 season, the 2011–12 league champions entered directly the group stage of the UEFA Champions League instead of having to compete in the qualifying rounds. The remaining allocation of European spots remains unchanged.

Teams 
Randers and Esbjerg finished the 2010–11 season in 11th and 12th place, respectively, and were relegated to the 2011–12 1st Division. Randers were relegated after five seasons in the Superliga, while Esbjerg leave after 10 seasons in the league.

The relegated teams were replaced by 2010–11 1st Division champions AGF and runners-up HB Køge. Both clubs make their immediate return to the highest Danish football league.

Stadia and locations

Personnel and sponsoring 
Note: Flags indicate national team as has been defined under FIFA eligibility rules. Players and Managers may hold more than one non-FIFA nationality.

Managerial changes 

Originally, Skarbalius was meant to take over the assistant coach job at Brøndby on 31 December 2011 at the end of his HB Køge contract and be replaced by Tommy Møller Nielsen, however on 24 October Henrik Jensen was fired and the move was moved forwards, while Skarbalius was made head coach.

Roland Nilsson became the second head coach to be fired with his team top of the Superliga after Christian Andersen was fired by Akademisk Boldklub after 11 rounds of the 1998–99 season.

League table

Results

Matchday 1–11

Matchday 12–33

Top goalscorers

References 

1
Dan
2011-12